Bergstein is German for "hill rock" and may refer to:

Places 
 Bergstein (Hürtgenwald), a village in the parish of Hürtgenwald, county of Düren, North Rhine-Westphalia
 Bergstein (Gemeinde Völkermarkt), a village in the borough of  Völkermarkt, Province of Völkermarkt, Carinthia

Natural monuments 
 Bergstein (Hohe Loog), near Neustadt an der Weinstraße
 Bergstein (Weinbiet), near Neustadt an der Weinstraße

People 
 Brian Bergstein
 David Bergstein (born 1962), American entrepreneur and film producer
 Eleanor Bergstein (born 1938), American writer, best known for writing and co-producing the film Dirty Dancing
 Fania Bergstein (1908–1950), Hebrew poet, born in Szczuczyn, in Russian Poland
 Iben Bergstein (born 1995), Danish badminton player
 Stan Bergstein (1924–2011), American sports executive
 Svend Bergstein (1941–2014), Danish officer and politician

See also 
 Steinberg (disambiguation)